Claus Offe (born 16 March 1940 in Berlin) is a political sociologist of Marxist orientation. He received his PhD from the University of Frankfurt and his Habilitation at the University of Konstanz. In Germany, he has held chairs for Political Science and Political Sociology at the Universities of Bielefeld (1975–1989) and Bremen (1989–1995), as well as at the Humboldt-University of Berlin (1995–2005). He has worked as fellow and visiting professor at the Institutes for Advanced Study in Stanford, Princeton, and the Australian National University as well as Harvard University, the University of California at Berkeley and The New School University, New York. Once a student of Jürgen Habermas, the left-leaning German academic is counted among the second generation Frankfurt School. He currently teaches political sociology at a private university in Berlin, the Hertie School of Governance.

He has made substantive contributions to understanding the relationships between democracy and capitalism. His recent work has focused on economies and states in transition to democracy.

He has been married to Ulrike Poppe since 2001.

Fields of research
 Political sociology
 Social policy
 Democratic theory
 Transformation studies
 Dual allocation problem
 Late capitalism
 Basic income

Basic income

Claus Offe is one of the founding members of Basic Income European Network, a network that later renamed to Basic Income Earth Network, and he has written several articles and books around the idea ever since the 1980s. Here are a few examples that indicates his way of thinking on the issue.

Basic income and gradualism (with "participation income" as an example) 
In the article "A Basic Income for All", published as a response to a text by Philippe Van Parijs in Boston Review, Offe clarifies some of his thoughts about the universal basic income and how to get there.

He starts off by saying that he agrees with Van Parijs that basic income clearly is a "morally attractive arrangement" and also think that Van Parijs provides a "normatively compelling argument for it in terms of real freedom and social justice". But then directly moves on to the question of why so many people, both elites and non-elites, seem reluctant or even against the idea of an unconditional basic income. He argues that one way of looking at this is to acknowledge that certain groups may well have legitimate or rational reasons to fear the introduction of unconditional basic income. Employers may, for example, fear that their control over the workers may be weakened. Individuals and organizations may also fear that the "moral underpinnings of a social order" will be substantially weakened, that is the idea that everyone should work, employed or self-employed, in order to have a legitimate right to a living income. There is also the fear, he notes, that the tax will be too high.

Taking these fears into account Offe suggests that the basic income implementation should be "governed by principles of gradualism and reversibility". Instead of thinking about basic income implementation as "before" and "after" he thinks it is better to think conceptualize and promote the system change in the dynamic terms of less and more. One way of gradually moving towards a universal basic income, according to Offe, could be to expand the list of groups, conditions and activities that are recognized as legitimate for something like a basic income already today. In other words, try to create a system of "participation income" before the real basic income, as Tony Atkinson earlier proposed in the name of a "participation income".

Career movements
 2006 – Joint Professor of Theories of the State, Hertie School of Governance, Berlin (with Ulrich K. Preuss).
 2005 – Retired in April.
 1995–2005 — Professor of Political Science at the Humboldt University of Berlin.
 1989–1995 — Teacher at University of Bremen and served as visiting professor at various academic institutions in US, Netherlands, Canada, Austria, Sweden, Australia and Italy.
 1973 – Habilitation from the University of Konstanz.
 1968 – Received a doctorate from the University of Frankfurt.
 1965 – Graduated from the Free University of Berlin.

Recent publications
 2014 — Europe Entrapped, Cambridge: Polity Press, .
 2010 — "Inequality and the Labour Market." Online: Institut für Arbeitsmarkt und Berufsforschung
 2005 — Reflections on America: Tocqueville, Weber and Adorno in the United States, Cambridge: University Press, .
 1998 — Institutional Design in Post-Communist Societies. Rebuilding the Ship at Sea. (with Jon Elster and Ulrich K. Preuss), Cambridge: University Press, .
 1996 — The Varieties of Transition: The East European and East German Experience (with Jeremy Gaines), Cambridge: Polity Press, .
 1996 — Modernity and The State: East and West. (with Charles Turner and Jeremy Gaines), Cambridge: Polity Press, .
 1982 — with Volker Gransow. "Political Culture and the Politics of the Social Democratic Government". Telos 53 (Fall 1982). New York: Telos Press

Notes

External links
 Homepage of Claus Offe at the Hertie School of Governance
 Encyclopedia : Disorganized Capitalism, Claus Offe
 Oxford index : Disorganized Capitalism, Claus Offe

1940 births
Living people
Writers from Berlin
German sociologists
Alliance 90/The Greens politicians
Sozialistischer Deutscher Studentenbund members
Harkness Fellows
Academic staff of Hertie School
German male writers
Universal basic income activists
Universal basic income writers